is a former Japanese footballer.

Career statistics
Updated to end of 2020 season.

References

External links
Profile at Kyoto Sanga

1983 births
Living people
Osaka Gakuin University alumni
Association football people from Osaka Prefecture
Japanese footballers
J1 League players
J2 League players
Vissel Kobe players
Nagoya Grampus players
Kyoto Sanga FC players
Association football defenders
People from Settsu, Osaka